St. Paul's Episcopal Church is a historic church at 27 Pleasant Street in Brunswick, Maine.  Built in 1845, it is a distinctive early example of a modest Carpenter Gothic design by Richard Upjohn, then already well known for his larger-scale Gothic churches.  The building was listed on the National Register of Historic Places in 1978.  The rector is Rev. Carolyn H. Eklund.

Architecture
St. Paul's is located two blocks west of Brunswick's Maine Street downtown area, at the southeast corner of Pleasant and Union Streets.  The church is a modest cruciform structure, built out of wood and finished in vertical board-and-batten siding.  It is covered by a gabled roof, and diverges from standard plans published by Upjohn in that it has no tower, and that it has transepts, which were not present in plans found in his 1852 Upjohn's Rural Architecture guide.  It has lancet-arched Gothic windows on the sides, and the entrance, at the west end, is set in a lancet-arched opening sheltered by a bracketed hood.  Each of the gable ends has a small oculus window in the gable.

The Brunswick Episcopal congregation was organized in 1844, and was the third established in the state of Maine.  This church, built in 1845, was designed by Richard Upjohn, who had already achieved national notice through the construction of Trinity Church in Manhattan (1841, now a National Historic Landmark), and St. John's Episcopal Church in Bangor (1839, burned 1911).  Upjohn's fame brought much business, including for smaller and less well-to-do parishes, leading to his publication in 1852 of Upjohn's Rural Architecture.  This church is a clear precursor of the designs published there, which were later widely used.

See also
National Register of Historic Places listings in Cumberland County, Maine

References

External links
St. Paul's Episcopal Church web site

Episcopal church buildings in Maine
Churches on the National Register of Historic Places in Maine
Carpenter Gothic church buildings in Maine
Churches completed in 1845
19th-century Episcopal church buildings
Buildings and structures in Brunswick, Maine
Churches in Cumberland County, Maine
Richard Upjohn church buildings
National Register of Historic Places in Cumberland County, Maine